Charles Sinclair or St Clair is the name of:
Charles Sinclair (screenwriter) of The Green Slime and Batman television episodes
Charles Sinclair, character in Aces: Iron Eagle III
Charles St Clair, 17th Lord Sinclair (1914–2004), Scottish soldier, courtier and representative peer
Charles Sinclair (businessman) (born 1948), British businessman
Charles Colin Sinclair (boxer) (born 1890), Australian Olympic boxer
Charles T. Sinclair, an American serial killer also known as the "Coin Shop Killer"
Charles E. Sinclair (1828-1887), Virginia judge
Charles Sinclair, Jr., Jamaican politician